The Ika language is an Igboid language spoken primarily by the Ika people of Delta and Edo states of southern Nigeria.

The Ika people are specifically located in the North-West of Delta State but some like Igbanke, Inyelen and Ekpon are presently located in Edo State. Ika communities mostly comprise the following: Agbor , Owa, Umunede, Mbiri, Abavo, Orogodo, Otolokpo, Igbodo, Ute-Okpu, Ute-Ugbeje, Idumuesah, Akumazi, Ekpon (Edo State), Igbanke (Edo State), Inyelen Edo State), Iru egbede (Edo State).

Other Ika communities found in Edo State are Owanikeke, Owa-Riuzo Idu, Igbogili, Ute Oheze and Ute Obagie N’Oheze. On Delta Radio there is now news in Ika. Ikas have commenced writing the Bible in their language, and right now the gospels of Mark, Luke, Matthew and John have been published in Ika along with other books. Ifeanyi Okowa is a prominent son of Ika background.

There are other Ika speaking communities who are presently in Edo state, namely; 
 Igbanke
 Ekpon
 Owa
 Ute Oheze
 Ute Obagie N’Oheze
 Iru 
 Oghada 
 Ogan

Belief 
The Ika people are predominantly Christian's as Christianity is the most common religion practiced among  the Ika people although with traditional worship still in practice also.

Economy 
The Ika (of Delta state) brag of being the home to the best African Palmwine. Ika clan are significantly Farmers and the rich participate in Palm wine business with red oil extraction or different structures, for example, palm wine tapping is their major source of income.

Further reading

References

External links  
 
 
 
 

Languages of Nigeria
Subject–object–verb languages
Igboid languages